Women's Murder Club: Games of Passion is a 2009 video game for the Nintendo DS. It is an adaptation of the TV series Women's Murder Club.

Development

THQ unveiled Games of Passion at E3 2009.

Reception
Games of Passion was met with a mixed or averaged  reception, receiving a Metacritic score of 53%. Game People review found that the game focused overly on narration and not enough on gameplay. According to IGN, "Women's Murder Club is notable for two things: Teaching people how to avoid being arrested for murder and its Mad Libs bonus mode. The rest is fairly forgettable, though I suppose fans of James Patterson might want to be part of the unique storyline."

References

2009 video games
Video games featuring female protagonists
Nintendo DS games
Nintendo DS-only games
Video games about police officers
Video games based on television series
Video games based on adaptations
Video games developed in the United States